John Butler (born April 3, 1973) is an American football coach who is the defensive backs coach and passing game coordinator for the Buffalo Bills of the National Football League (NFL). He previously served as the secondary coach for the Houston Texans and has coached collegiately at several schools, including Penn State, South Carolina, and Minnesota.

Coaching career

College
Butler began his coaching career as an assistant at his alma mater, Catholic University, as a defensive backs coach before being promoted to defensive coordinator in 1996. He then progressed to Texas, where he served as a graduate assistant under both John Mackovic and Mack Brown in 1997 and 1998 respectively. After spending the next four years in the lower levels of college football, he returned to the Football Bowl Subdivision (FBS) in 2003 with Harvard, where he worked as the linebackers coach and special teams coach. His first connection to Ted Roof came from 2007-2010 while working for the Minnesota Golden Gophers as the linebackers coach under Roof. The Houston Texans hired Butler as a defensive assistant in the off-season, but then was hired by South Carolina where he served for one year.  Butler re-united with Roof on Bill O'Brien's staff at Penn State. After Roof moved back to his alma mater at Georgia Tech, Butler was promoted to defensive coordinator over two more experienced assistants, linebackers coach Ron Vanderlinden and defensive line coach Larry Johnson.

Professional
In early 2014, Butler left Penn State to join O'Brien's Houston Texans staff as secondary coach. On January 2, 2018 he was fired by the Houston Texans. On January 30, 2018 Butler was hired by the Buffalo Bills coaching staff under head coach and former high school teammate Sean McDermott. On February 24, 2022, he gained the additional title of passing game coordinator.

References

External links
 Buffalo Bills bio

1973 births
Living people
Buffalo Bills coaches
Catholic University Cardinals football players
Catholic University Cardinals football coaches
Catholic University Cardinals men's basketball players
Harvard Crimson football coaches
Houston Texans coaches
Midwestern State Mustangs football coaches
Minnesota Golden Gophers football coaches
Penn State Nittany Lions football coaches
South Carolina Gamecocks football coaches
Texas Longhorns football coaches
Texas State Bobcats football coaches
Sportspeople from Philadelphia
Players of American football from Pennsylvania